St. Nicholas Cathedral in Nizhyn is the main Eastern Orthodoxy church of Nizhyn eparchy in the Ukraine. The powerful centric 55-metres high building with five domes has become a prototype Ukrainian baroque architecture of stone five-domed cruciform churches. The cathedral reproduces in brick the techniques conventional to Ukrainian wooden folk architecture.

The special and parade role of building is likewise emphasized in the interior, where both sides of the main entrance are arranged with placing special loggias for regimental starshyna. The predominant location of the cathedral among the surrounding city buildings is still beyond the competition, although the public centre moved to the other square. The main axis of the city goes from the market the Oster River.

See also 
 Ukrainian Baroque
 All Saints Church, Nizhyn

Buildings and structures in Nizhyn
Eastern Orthodox cathedrals in Ukraine